Giannoulis Fakinos (born 9 July 1989), also known as Yiannoulis Fakinos, is a retired Greek football player, who last played for  Punjab United.

Club career
He began his career at Koronida FC (Galatsi), before moving to play professionally for Olympiacos, Panionios, Ilioupoli and Apollon Smyrni.

He is a midfielder who is suited into the central midfielder role, but can also play as a "holding role" as a defensive midfielder or an attacking midfielder. He is known for his quick acceleration and good passing ability.

In March 2011, Fakinos transferred to Ebbsfleet United in the Conference South and played a role in Ebbsfleet's promotion to the Conference National via the Play-offs.

On 1 March 2013, Fakinos joined Welling United in the Conference South.

In the summer of 2013 he once again joined Ebbsfleet United, after spending some time with Bromley in pre-season.

On 11 October 2013, Fakinos joined Margate on a two-month loan in the Isthmian League Premier Division. After his loan came to an end, he joined Isthmian League Premier Division strugglers Cray Wanderers. He made over 50 appearances in the 2014–15 season.

He began the 2015–16 season with VCD Athletic.

References

External links

Footballzz profile
Margate profile

1989 births
Living people
People from Naxos
Place of birth unknown
Greek footballers
Association football midfielders
Olympiacos F.C. players
Panionios F.C. players
Ilioupoli F.C. players
Apollon Smyrnis F.C. players
Ebbsfleet United F.C. players
Welling United F.C. players
Margate F.C. players
Cray Wanderers F.C. players
Super League Greece players
National League (English football) players
Greek expatriate footballers
Greek expatriate sportspeople in England
Sportspeople from the South Aegean
Expatriate footballers in England